Ericameria cooperi, or Cooper's goldenbush, is a North American species of shrubs that grows in the desert regions of southern Nevada, southern and eastern California, and Baja California.

Ericameria cooperi is a shrub. Leaves are long and narrow, sometimes thread-like, without hairs. One plant can produce several flower heads in a flat-topped array, each head containing 6-7 disc florets but no ray florets.

Varieties
Ericameria cooperi var. bajacalifornica (Urbatsch & Wussow) Urbatsch - Baja California
Ericameria cooperi var. cooperi - Baja California, California, Nevada

References

External links
Photo of herbarium specimen at Missouri Botanical Garden, collected in California in 1882, syntype of Aster monactis, syn of Ericameria cooperi

cooperi
Flora of California
Flora of Baja California
Flora of Nevada
Flora of the California desert regions
Natural history of the Mojave Desert
Plants described in 1873
Taxa named by Asa Gray
Flora without expected TNC conservation status